Kitakyushu City General Gymnasium is an arena in Kitakyushu, Fukuoka, Japan.

References

External links
Kita Kyushu General Gymnasium

Buildings and structures in Kitakyushu
Basketball venues in Japan
Indoor arenas in Japan
Rizing Zephyr Fukuoka
Sports venues in Fukuoka Prefecture
Sports venues completed in 1974
1974 establishments in Japan